The 1981 Chatham Cup was the 54th annual nationwide knockout football competition in New Zealand.

Early stages of the competition were run in three regions (northern, central, and southern), with the National League teams receiving a bye until the Fourth Round of the competition. In all, 124 teams took part in the competition. Note: Different sources give different numberings for the rounds of the competition: some start round one with the beginning of the regional qualifications; others start numbering from the first national knock-out stage. The former numbering scheme is used in this article.

The major talking-point of the 1981 competition was the giant-killing run of Stop Out, who caused upsets against the higher-ranked Nelson United, Miramar Rangers and Wellington Diamond United on their way to the semi-finals.

The 1981 final
The final was a repeat of the 1980 final, but this time it was Dunedin City that finished victorious - the first win for any team from that southern city since 1961. 

An early goal from a Billy McClure penalty put the Mount into the lead, but a brace of well-taken goals by Michael Glubb, complemented by a late strike from Terry Wilson were enough to take the cup south.

Results

Third Round

* Won on penalties by Papakura City (8-7)

Fourth Round

* Won on penalties by Christchurch Rangers (5-4)

Fifth Round

* North Shore United won 5-4 on penalties.

Quarter-finals

* Stop Out won 4-2 on penalties.

Semi-finals

Final

References

Rec.Sport.Soccer Statistics Foundation New Zealand 1981 page
UltimateNZSoccer website 1981 Chatham Cup page

Chatham Cup
Chatham Cup
Chatham Cup
Chat